Fredy Schultheiss was a Swiss rower. He competed in the men's eight event at the 1948 Summer Olympics.

References

External links
 

Year of birth missing
Year of death missing
Swiss male rowers
Olympic rowers of Switzerland
Rowers at the 1948 Summer Olympics
Place of birth missing